Kapar is a sort of traditional temporary dwelling in Southeastern Iran and the Baluchi areas of Pakistan and Afghanistan.
A shelter of long frames Kapar is often made of Tamarisk and palm trees, and has vertical composition.

Sources 
Maleki Shoja, Kiana and Aminravan, Mojgan: Tribal housing structures analysis in Balochistan of Iran. In: Journal of Research in Ecology. ISSN No: Print: 2319 –1546; Online: 2319– 1554

Buildings and structures in Iran
Buildings and structures in Pakistan
Buildings and structures in Afghanistan